Dream Lover is a 1993 American erotic thriller film written and directed by Nicholas Kazan and starring James Spader and Mädchen Amick, with Bess Armstrong, Frederic Lehne, and Larry Miller in supporting roles. The original music score was composed by Christopher Young.

Plot
The film opens on divorce proceedings involving Ray Reardon, a successful architect, and his first wife. Shortly after their divorce, he agrees to go to a gallery opening to meet a woman with whom his obnoxious friend, Norman, sets him up.

While there, he embarrasses himself by bumping into a woman, making her spill wine on herself. She wastes no time verbally abusing him. A week later, he runs into the woman, named Lena Mathers, at the supermarket. She apologizes for her behavior and the two go to dinner. They have sex the next day, marry shortly thereafter, and become parents.

Despite his happiness in the marriage, Ray becomes suspicious after catching Lena in several lies about her past. An assistant for one of his clients went to Swarthmore College one year before Lena but, while the assistant remembers the university president dying of a heart attack while giving a university wide talk, Lena has no recollection of the president, thinking he was another student. A woman meets the couple at a restaurant but Lena says the woman has confused her for a woman named "Sissy" from Piru, Texas. A few years later, Ray visits Piru, Texas and is told by a town resident that a picture of Lena shown by Ray is Sissy, nickname for Thelma. He visits the family home and meets Lena's parents, who recognize him and know his name. He finds out that alleged beatings of Lena as a child by her mother didn't happen (admitted by Lena) and that Lena had told her parents Ray was an employee of the U.S. Central Intelligence Agency.

Over time, Ray becomes increasingly paranoid when his wife begins sporting bruises that she will not explain and begins doing things that indicate she is having an affair. During a tense confrontation, Lena taunts Ray by claiming to have had an affair with an unnamed friend of his and refusing to tell Ray if their children are biologically his. Ray hits Lena, who then has him arrested and committed to a mental hospital for observation.

Despite an attempt to prove that Lena has been lying, the judge finds Ray to be mentally incompetent and orders him held for six months. Shortly after Ray has been committed, Lena privately admits to him that his suspicions about her were correct all along and that she had planned for years to do what she did to get his money.

Realising that he has been thoroughly deceived and his property and children usurped, Ray devises a plan to seek revenge. He convinces Elaine to tell Lena that she has made a mistake in her "master plan". Elaine suspects Lena has been having an affair with Larry, who secretly bought a house in New Zealand without Elaine's knowledge and might be an escape plan by Lena.

Lena shows up at his birthday party to talk to him. Ray lures her away from the attendants who are supposed to be supervising him and tells her that having him declared insane was the "mistake" because he could not now be held legally accountable for killing her. He then proceeds to strangle her to death on the lawn.

Cast
 James Spader as Ray Reardon
 Mädchen Amick as Lena Mathers Reardon
 Fredric Lehne as Larry
 Bess Armstrong as Elaine
 Larry Miller as Norman
 Kathleen York as Martha
 Kate Williamson as Mrs. Sneeder
 Tom Lillard as Hank Sneeder
 William Shockley as Buddy
 Joel McKinnon Miller as Minister
 Archie Lang as Judge
 Clyde Kusatsu as Judge Kurita

See also
List of films featuring home invasions

References

External links
 
 
 
 
 

1993 films
1993 directorial debut films
1993 independent films
1993 thriller films
1990s erotic thriller films
1990s mystery thriller films
1990s psychological thriller films
American erotic thriller films
American independent films
American mystery thriller films
American psychological thriller films
Erotic mystery films
Films scored by Christopher Young
Films shot in New Jersey
Home invasions in film
PolyGram Filmed Entertainment films
1990s English-language films
1990s American films